Nestvarne stvari (trans. Unreal Things) is the only album by Serbian post-punk/gothic rock band Luna, released in 1984.

Track listing
All lyrics and music written by Slobodan Tišma and Zoran Bulatović.

Personnel
 Artur (Slobodan Tišma) — vocals
 Balder (Zoran Bulatović "Bale") — guitar, backing vocals
 Firchie (Ivan Fece) — drums
 Jasmina Mitrušić — synthesizer, backing vocals

Legacy
In 2015 Nestvarne stvari album cover was ranked 60th on the list of 100 Greatest Album Covers of Yugoslav Rock published by web magazine Balkanrock.

References

External links and other sources
 Nestvarne stvari LP at Discogs
 Nestvarne stvari CD at Discogs
 EX YU ROCK enciklopedija 1960-2006, Janjatović Petar; 
 NS rockopedija, novosadska rock scena 1963-2003, Mijatović Bogomir; Publisher: SWITCH, 2005

Luna (1980s Serbian band) albums
1984 debut albums